Tripod Rock is a balancing rock, or perched boulder, located in Kinnelon, New Jersey in the Pyramid Mountain Natural Historic Area. This multi-ton Precambrian gneiss boulder, located near the edge of a long ridge, is balanced on three smaller boulders. A triangular crest runs the length of its top. The point of contact between the boulder and its support stones forms an approximate 3-4-5 triangle.

The two larger boulders are partially balanced on smaller stones (see diagram). Sighting from a bedrock outcrop near Tripod Rock through the two large boulders, the apex of the rock triangle points across to the next ridge on the western horizon. This line of sight intersects the sunset on the summer solstice. During the early 1980s, Tripod Rock and its nearby stones were surveyed. The sunset point on the ridge at the summer solstice was visible due to gypsy moth defoliation. A large boulder was visible on the ridge at the place of the summer solstice sunset. Within a year of the survey, a home was constructed on that site and the boulder was displaced by earth-moving machinery.  the summer solstice sunset was only partially visible near the edge of that residence.

No specific calendar alignment has been noted. Tripod Rock stands on a ridge overlooking a long valley where a massive glacial erratic named Bear Rock is located near a brook. Bear Rock was thoroughly excavated for archaeological artifacts during the 19th century, some of which are reported to be owned by museums. Bear Rock has a large overhang making it a possible rock shelter.

While there is no evidence that Tripod Rock was ever used as a solar observatory, it could function as one if a small portion of the ridge across the valley were kept clear. Tripod Rock is presumed to be a naturally deposited, though oddly perched, glacial erratic.

References

External links

 Pyramid Mountain Natural Historic Area official website, with trail maps and visitor information for the park that contains Tripod Rock
 Tripod Rock at New Jersey Skylands Visitor website
 Trail description at Trails.com
 Pyramid Mountain and Tripod Rock at City University of New York, Department of Geography

Glacial erratics of the United States
Landforms of Morris County, New Jersey
Tourist attractions in Morris County, New Jersey